Torlarp Sethsothorn (born 24 September 1979) is a Thai former swimmer who competed in the 1996 Summer Olympics.

References

1979 births
Living people
Torlarp Sethsothorn
Torlarp Sethsothorn
Swimmers at the 1996 Summer Olympics
Swimmers at the 1994 Asian Games
Swimmers at the 1998 Asian Games
Medalists at the 1994 Asian Games
Medalists at the 1998 Asian Games
Asian Games medalists in swimming
Torlarp Sethsothorn
Torlarp Sethsothorn
Torlarp Sethsothorn
Torlarp Sethsothorn
Torlarp Sethsothorn
Competitors at the 1995 Southeast Asian Games
Torlarp Sethsothorn